Dii is also the plural of Latin Deus. 

The Dii  were an independent Thracian tribe, swordsmen, who lived among the foothills of Mount Rhodope in Thrace, and particularly in the east bank of Nestos, from the springs to the Nestos gorge. They often joined the ranks of organized armies as mercenaries or volunteers. Thucydides declared that they were the most warlike infantry in Sitalkes' army.

Though usually described as swordsmen, they defeated a Theban cavalry by using peltast tactics, so they were certainly skilled in other areas of warfare as well.

See also
Bessi

References

Ancient tribes in the Balkans
Ancient tribes in Bulgaria
Ancient mercenaries
Thracian tribes